Yakassé-Attobrou is a town in southeastern Ivory Coast. It is a sub-prefecture of and the seat of Yakassé-Attobrou Department in La Mé Region, Lagunes District. Yakassé-Attobrou is also a commune.

References

Sub-prefectures of La Mé
Communes of La Mé